T/O might mean one of the following:

 Takeoff
 Table of Organization and Equipment
 Takeout double

See also
 TO (disambiguation)